Hubris, or less frequently hybris, describes a personality quality of extreme or excessive pride or dangerous overconfidence, often in combination with (or synonymous with) arrogance. The term arrogance comes from the Latin , meaning "to feel that one has a right to demand certain attitudes and behaviors from other people". To arrogate means "to claim or seize without justification... To make undue claims to having", or "to claim or seize without right... to ascribe or attribute without reason". The term pretension is also associated with the term hubris, but is not synonymous with it.

According to studies, hubris, arrogance, and pretension are related to the need for victory (even if it does not always mean winning) instead of reconciliation, which "friendly" groups might promote. Hubris is usually perceived as a characteristic of an individual rather than a group, although the group the offender belongs to may suffer collateral consequences from wrongful acts. Hubris often indicates a loss of contact with reality and an overestimation of one's own competence, accomplishments, or capabilities. The adjectival form of the noun hubris/hybris is hubristic/hybristic.

The term hubris originated in Ancient Greek, where it had several different meanings depending on the context. In legal usage, it meant assault or sexual crimes and theft of public property, and in religious usage it meant transgression against a god.

Ancient Greek origin

Common use
In ancient Greek, hubris referred to “outrage”: actions that violated natural order, or which shamed and humiliated the victim, sometimes for the pleasure or gratification of the abuser. In some contexts, the term had a sexual connotation. Shame was frequently reflected upon the perpetrator, as well.

Legal usage
In legal terms, hubristic violations of the law included what might today be termed assault-and-battery, sexual crimes, or the theft of public or sacred property. Two well-known cases are found in the speeches of Demosthenes, a prominent statesman and orator in ancient Greece. These two examples occurred when first Midias punched Demosthenes in the face in the theatre (Against Midias), and second when (in Against Conon) a defendant allegedly assaulted a man and crowed over the victim. Yet another example of hubris appears in Aeschines' Against Timarchus, where the defendant, Timarchus, is accused of breaking the law of hubris by submitting himself to prostitution and anal intercourse. Aeschines brought this suit against Timarchus to bar him from the rights of political office and his case succeeded.

In ancient Athens, hubris was defined as the use of violence to shame the victim (this sense of hubris could also characterize rape). Aristotle defined hubris as shaming the victim, not because of anything that happened to the committer or might happen to the committer, but merely for that committer's own gratification:
to cause shame to the victim, not in order that anything may happen to you, nor because anything has happened to you, but merely for your own gratification. Hubris is not the requital of past injuries; this is revenge. As for the pleasure in hubris, its cause is this: naive men think that by ill-treating others they make their own superiority the greater.

Crucial to this definition are the ancient Greek concepts of honour (τιμή, timē) and shame (αἰδώς, aidōs). The concept of honour included not only the exaltation of the one receiving honour, but also the shaming of the one overcome by the act of hubris. This concept of honour is akin to a zero-sum game. Rush Rehm simplifies this definition of hubris to the contemporary concept of "insolence, contempt, and excessive violence".

Modern usage 
In its modern usage, hubris denotes overconfident pride combined with arrogance. Hubris is often associated with a lack of humility. Sometimes a person's hubris is also associated with ignorance. The accusation of hubris often implies that suffering or punishment will follow, similar to the occasional pairing of hubris and nemesis in Greek mythology. The proverb "pride goeth (goes) before destruction, a haughty spirit before a fall" (from the biblical Book of Proverbs, 16:18) is thought to sum up the modern use of hubris. Hubris is also referred to as "pride that blinds" because it often causes a committer of hubris to act in foolish ways that belie common sense. In other words, the modern definition may be thought of as, "that pride that goes just before the fall."

Examples of hubris often appear in literature, archetypically in Greek tragedy, and arguably most famously in John Milton's Paradise Lost, in which Lucifer attempts to compel the other angels to worship him, is cast into hell by God and the innocent angels, and proclaims: "Better to reign in hell than serve in heaven." Victor in Mary Shelley's Frankenstein manifests hubris in his attempt to become a great scientist; he creates life through technological means, but comes to regret his project. Marlowe's play Doctor Faustus portrays the eponymous character as a scholar whose arrogance and pride compel him to sign a deal with the Devil, and retain his haughtiness until his death and damnation, despite the fact that he could easily have repented had he chosen to do so.

General George Armstrong Custer furnished a historical example of hubris in the decisions that culminated in the 1876 Battle of Little Big Horn; he apocryphally exclaimed: "Where did all those damned Indians come from?"

Larry Wall promoted "the three great virtues of a programmer: laziness, impatience, and hubris".

Arrogance 

The Oxford English Dictionary defines "arrogance" in terms of "high or inflated opinion of one's own abilities, importance, etc., that gives rise to presumption or excessive self-confidence, or to a feeling or attitude of being superior to others [...]."
Adrian Davies sees arrogance as more generic and less severe than hubris.

Religious usage

Ancient Greece 
The Greek word for sin, hamartia (ἁμαρτία), originally meant "error" in the ancient dialect, and so poets like Hesiod and Aeschylus used the word "hubris" to describe transgressions against the gods. A common way that hubris was committed was when a mortal claimed to be better than a god in a particular skill or attribute. Claims like these were rarely left unpunished, and so Arachne, a talented young weaver, was transformed into a spider when she said that her skills exceeded those of the goddess Athena. Additional examples include Icarus, Phaethon, Salmoneus, Niobe, Cassiopeia, Tantalus, and Tereus.

These events were not limited to myth, and certain figures in history were considered to have been punished for committing hubris through their arrogance. One such person was king Xerxes as portrayed in Aeschylus's play The Persians, and who allegedly threw chains to bind the Hellespont sea as punishment for daring to destroy his fleet.

What is common to all these examples is the breaching of limits, as the Greeks believed that the Fates (Μοῖραι) had assigned each being with a particular area of freedom, an area that even the gods could not breach.

The goddess Hybris is described in the Encyclopædia Britannica Eleventh Edition as having "insolent encroachment upon the rights of others".

Christianity
In the Old Testament, the "hubris is overweening pride, superciliousness or arrogance, often resulting in fatal retribution or nemesis". Proverbs 16:18 states: "Pride goes before destruction, a haughty spirit before a fall".

The word hubris as used in the New Testament parallels the Hebrew word pasha, meaning "transgression". It represents a pride that "makes a man defy God", sometimes to the degree that he considers himself an equal.
In contrast to this, the common word for "sin" was hamartia, which refers to an error and reflects the complexity of the human condition. Its result is guilt rather than direct punishment (as in the case of hubris).

C. S. Lewis wrote in Mere Christianity that pride is the "anti-God" state, the position in which the ego and the self are directly opposed to God. "Unchastity, anger, greed, drunkenness, and all that, are mere fleabites in comparison; it was through Pride that the devil became the devil; Pride leads to every other vice; it is the complete anti-God state of mind."

See also

References

Further reading 
 Nicolas R. E. Fisher, Hybris: A Study in the Values of Honour and Shame in Ancient Greece, Warminster, Aris & Phillips, 1992. 
 
 
 Michael DeWilde, "The Psychological and Spiritual Roots of a Universal Affliction"
 Hubris on 2012's Encyclopædia Britannica
 
 Robert A. Stebbins, From Humility to Hubris among Scholars and Politicians: Exploring Expressions of Self-Esteem and Achievement. Bingley, UK: Emerald Group Publishing, 2017.

External links 

 
 

Narcissism
Barriers to critical thinking
Pride
Psychological attitude
Religious terminology
Seven deadly sins